Archibald Douglas may refer to:

Archibald I, Lord of Douglas (c. 1198–1238)
Sir Archibald Douglas (died 1333), Guardian of Scotland. (killed 1333, at the Battle of Halidon Hill)
Archibald Douglas, 3rd Earl of Douglas
Archibald Douglas, 4th Earl of Douglas (1370–1424), duke of Touraine
Archibald Douglas, 5th Earl of Douglas (1390–1439)
Archibald Douglas, Earl of Moray (1426–1455)
Archibald Douglas, 5th Earl of Angus (1453–1514) "Bell-the-Cat"
Archibald Douglas of Kilspindie (1475–1536)
Archibald Douglas, 6th Earl of Angus (1490–1557) 
Archibald Douglas, Parson of Douglas (before 1540–after 1587)
Archibald Douglas, 8th Earl of Angus (1556–1588) (also 5th Earl of Morton)
Archibald Douglas, 1st Earl of Ormond (1609–1655)
Archibald Douglas, 1st Earl of Forfar and 2nd Earl of Ormond (1653–1712)
Archibald Douglas, 2nd Earl of Forfar and 3rd Earl of Ormond (1692–1715) 
Archibald Douglas, 13th of Cavers (died 1741), Member of Parliament for Dumfries Burghs 1727–34
Archibald Douglas, 1st Duke of Douglas (1694–1761)
Archibald Douglas (1707–1778), Member of Parliament for Dumfries Burghs 1754–61 and Dumfriesshire 1761–74
Archibald Douglas, 1st Baron Douglas (1748–1827), Member of Parliament for Forfarshire
Archibald Douglas, 8th Marquess of Queensberry (1818–1858) 
Sir Archibald Lucius Douglas (1842–1913), Canadian officer of the British Navy
Archibald Douglas, 4th Baron Blythswood, (1870–1929)
Archibald Douglas (1883–1960) (1883–1960), general, former Chief of the Swedish Army
Archibald Douglas of Glenbervie, Scottish nobleman
Archibald Douglas (American football), All-American football player for the United States Naval Academy in 1906 and 1907 College Football All-America Team
J. Archibald Douglas (born 1866), professor of English and History at Government College, Agra, known for debunking Nicolas Notovitch's claim that Jesus had visited India
Archibald Ramsay Douglas (1807–1886), Scottish miniature painter
Archie Douglas (1867–1953), English cricketer